is a Japanese politician who was Director General of the Japan Defense Agency (now Japan Ministry of Defense) in the first cabinet of former Prime Minister Junichiro Koizumi in 2001-2002 and was appointed as the Minister of Defense by former Prime Minister Shinzo Abe in 2014.

Nakatani was born in Kōchi and attended the National Defense Academy of Japan. He served for four years as a commissioned officer in the Japan Ground Self-Defense Force (20th Infantry Regiment and Airborne Training Unit).

He first ran for elected office as a Liberal Democratic Party candidate in the 1990 general election and won one of five seats representing Kōchi Prefecture, and held this seat in the 1993 general election. Following electoral reform in 1994 that divided Kōchi into three single-member districts, he successfully contested the Kōchi 2nd district in the 1996 general election and held this seat until the 2014 general election, when he switched to the Kōchi 1st district; the abolishment of the Kōchi 3rd district required the Liberal Democratic Party's Kōchi members to switch seats so that they could all remain in office. Yuji Yamamoto, who had held the 3rd district since 1996, switched to the 2nd district. Meanwhile Teru Fukui, who had held the 1st district since 1996, switched to the Shikoku proportional representation block.

Nakatani supported Koichi Kato and Taku Yamasaki's no-confidence motion against Prime Minister Yoshiro Mori in 2000, and was appointed to head the Japan Defense Agency under Prime Minister Junichiro Koizumi in the following year.

Notes

References

1957 births
Japan Ground Self-Defense Force personnel
Japanese defense ministers
Liberal Democratic Party (Japan) politicians
Living people
Members of the House of Representatives (Japan)
National Defense Academy of Japan alumni
21st-century Japanese politicians
People from Kōchi, Kōchi